Orpiszewek  is a village in the administrative district of Gmina Kotlin, within Jarocin County, Greater Poland Voivodeship, in west-central Poland.

The village has a population of 110.

References

Orpiszewek